Vajraghat is a Hindi-language action drama film directed by Rajan Thakur. This film was released in 1992. Ravindra Jain was the music composer of this film. The film stars Gulshan Grover and Sudhir Dalvi.

Plot

Cast
 Gulshan Grover
 Sudhir Dalvi
 Shiva Rindani
 Tom Alter
 Urmila Bhatt
 Subbiraj
 Mahesh Raj
 Pawan Gulati
 Sanjeeva
 Reshmi
 Bhanu Jain

References

External links
 

1992 films
1992 action films
1990s Hindi-language films
Indian action films
Hindi-language action films